The Huaibei–Xiaoxian railway is a railway line in Anhui, China.

History 
Construction of the line began in December 2014. It opened on 28 December 2017.

Route 
The line starts at Huaibei North railway station and heads north. There is one tunnel on the route, the  Gushang Village Tunnel. It joins the Zhengzhou–Xuzhou high-speed railway west of Xiaoxian North railway station.

References 

High-speed railway lines in China
Railway lines opened in 2017
Rail transport in Anhui